The Council of Unions of South Africa (CUSA) was a national trade union federation in South Africa.

History
The federation was founded on 14 September 1980 by the former affiliates of the Black Consultative Committee which did not wish to join the Federation of South African Trade Unions, as they felt it was dominated by white activists.  The new federation was more centralised than the former committee, and it was led by general secretary Phiroshaw Camay.  The federation strongly opposed the apartheid system, and affiliated to both the National Forum Committee and the United Democratic Front.

The council had seven affiliates, and saw initial growth, with 49,014 members by the end of 1981.  In 1982, it sought to organise mine workers, and so established the National Union of Mineworkers (NUM).  All the CUSA affiliates grew, with the NUM's growth being particularly rapid.  In contrast to many of its rivals, CUSA did not lay out any specific approach for affiliates to use in negotiating on pay and conditions; for example, some chose to join industrial councils, while others boycotted them.  Most chose to register with the Government of South Africa, but some chose not to do so.

The NUM left in 1985, to join the Congress of South African Trade Unions (COSATU).  In response, CUSA opened negotiations with the Azanian Confederation of Trade Unions (AZACTU).  By 1986, CUSA had 12 affiliates with a total of 147,000 members.  On 5 October, it merged with the AZACTU, to form the National Council of Trade Unions (NCTU).

Affiliates

References

National trade union centres of South Africa
Trade unions established in 1980
Trade unions disestablished in 1986